The Regata Sevilla-Betis is a rowing race that nowadays is held every year on the second Saturday of November on the river Guadalquivir, in Seville, Spain, between two eights drawn from the two most important football teams in the city: Sevilla Fútbol Club and Real Betis Balompié. The last race was on November 10, 2018, and was the 52 edition. At this moment, Sevilla has won 30 editions and Betis 22 of the main race.

The course covers the 3.6-mile (6200m) stretch of the Guadalquivir crossing the city from north to south, between the San Jerónimo bridge near Alamillo Park, to the Muelle de Nueva York, near Los Remedios Bridge.

History
The race goes back to the beginning of rowing in Seville, which is closely related to the foundation of Club Náutico Sevilla in 1956. It was Don Miguel López Torróntegui who, in 1960, had the idea of create a race on the water in the light of the friendly but intense rivalry between the two football teams.

See also
Seville

External links
Regata Sevilla-Betis official website

Sport in Seville
Rowing competitions in Spain